Zug is a surname. Notable people with the surname include:

 Graham Zug (born 1987), American football player
 James Zug (born 1969), American writer
 Mark Zug (born 1959), American artist and illustrator
 Peter Zug (born 1958), American politician
 Szymon Bogumił Zug (1733–1807), Polish-German architect